Asam Sahitya Sabha, Ôxôm Xahityô Xôbha or "Assam Literary Society") was founded in 1917 in Assam, India to promote the culture of Assam and Assamese literature.

Except regular biennially seasons in 2000 and 2002 special session was held at Jorhat and Kalgachia.

President, Time and Place

References

External links

 

Asam Sahitya Sabha presidents
Asam Sahitya Sabha presidents